Sicalis is a genus of birds in the tanager family Thraupidae. Sometimes classified in the bunting and American sparrow family Emberizidae, more recent studies have shown it to belong in the Thraupidae.

Taxonomy and species list
The genus Sicalis was introduced in 1828 by the German zoologist Friedrich Boie. The name is from the Ancient Greek σικαλίς/sikalis, a small, black-headed bird, mentioned by Epicharmus, Aristotle, and other authors. It was perhaps a warbler in the genus Sylvia. The type species is the saffron finch. The genus now contains 13 species.

References

 
Taxonomy articles created by Polbot